In physics, a dipole is a quantity involving some form of polarity.

Dipole may also refer to:

In physics
Electric dipole
Magnetic dipole
Dipole moment (disambiguation)
A flow dipole, a separation of a sink and a source in potential flow

In meteorology
Arctic dipole anomaly
Indian Ocean Dipole
Subtropical Indian Ocean Dipole

Other uses
Dipole antenna, a type of radio antenna
Dipole magnet, a permanent magnet
Dipole graph, a graph with two poles
Dipole speaker, a loudspeaker enclosure
Dipole model of the Earth's magnetic field, a first order approximation of the rather complex true Earth's magnetic field (which can be viewed as dipolar)
Dipole anisotropy, the progressive difference in the frequency of radiation from opposite directions due to the motion of the observer relative to the source
Dipole–dipole attraction, one of several intermolecular forces

See also
 Monopole (disambiguation)
 Quadrupole
 Multipole expansion
Bipolar (disambiguation)